Graziella Magherini (born 23 August 1927 in Florence) is an Italian psychiatrist at the Santa Maria Nuova Hospital in Florence, Italy.

Stendhal syndrome

Graziella Magherini is best known for her 1989 book La sindrome di Stendhal (The Stendhal syndrome), which introduced this term to indicate a psychosomatic illness affecting individuals when exposed to art. After nearly 20 years of experience with patients at Santa Maria Nuova Hospital in Florence, Italy, Dr. Magherini began to note certain pathological abnormalities in a select group of her patients. Foreign visitors who had arrived in droves to indulge in the sumptuous beauty and art of the city were stricken by sudden and mysterious psychosomatic episodes that were induced by their identification with select and "personalized" art. "The Stendhal Syndrome occurs most frequently in Florence, because we have the greatest concentration of Renaissance art in the world."

Her study The Stendhal Syndrome (La Sindrome di Stendhal), published in 1989, is a description of her statistical methodology and, most importantly, a detailed description of some of her most interesting cases. Many of the case histories describe a foreigner who arrives in Florence, Italy and is overwhelmed by unrelenting depictions of Renaissance art and culture.

In the 'Inge Case,' Inge arrives from a Scandinavian country where she teaches Italian to children. Her marriage is unsatisfactory and she is filled with the guilt of leaving her failing father, for whom she is a caregiver. Her Florence trip is the first she has taken in many years. Upon arrival she immediately feels 'out of sorts' and when she attends an Italian class for a second day, she notices someone has taken her seat from the day before. Inge takes this as a sign that no one wants her in Florence. Suddenly, she is afflicted with an overwhelming sense of paranoia. Later, she visits one of Florence's famous cathedrals. She is drawn to one version of The Last Supper. Inge has palpitations and sees flashes of lights. In between flashes she sees herself in the painting, as one of the women carrying a fruit basket to the table of Jesus. After steady decline in her mental condition she is admitted to the Santa Maria Nuova Hospital for observation.

From these cases, Dr. Magherini has some startling conclusions about the effects of artwork on the psyche. During the mirroring between art and subject, a sublime, aesthetic, and uncanny event occurs. The art experience hooks a repressed trauma beneath the conscious sea of the subject rapidly pulling the trauma to the surface. The subject acts much like a distressed fish out of water. Dr. Magherini's job was to unhook the patient from this episode while under observation and gently place the patient back into the society.

A related condition is the Jerusalem syndrome.

See also
 Stendhal syndrome
 Stendhal
 The Stendhal Syndrome, a psychological thriller film based on Magherini's book
 Culture shock
 Paris syndrome

Published works
 - Total pages: 219

References

Living people
Year of birth missing (living people)
Italian psychiatrists
21st-century Italian women writers
Italian women psychiatrists